Atlanta peronii is a species of sea snail, a holoplanktonic marine gastropod mollusk in the family Atlantidae, as well as its typetaxon.

Distribution
This species is seen in South Korea, South and East China Sea region of Mainland China, as well as ocean regions around Taiwan.

Description
The maximum recorded shell length is 11 mm.

Habitat
holoplanktonic, although habitat in sand-based shallow sea, the maximum recorded depth is 3338 m.

References

Atlantidae
Gastropods described in 1817